Evenus coronata, the crowned hairstreak, is a butterfly of the family Lycaenidae. It is found from southern Mexico up to Ecuador in a wide coastal area.

The wingspan can range up to 60 mm in males. Evenus coronata is a large, neotropical hairstreak butterfly.

References

Eumaeini
Taxa named by William Chapman Hewitson
Butterflies described in 1865
Butterflies of Central America
Lycaenidae of South America
Butterflies of North America